Guangdong has well-developed road, rail, air and water transport networks. Different areas of Guangdong are connected both economically and culturally by the waterways of the Pearl River. Water transport is responsible for more than two-fifths of Guangdong's total traffic tonnage. Connection with other provinces rely on Guangdong's extensive road and rail networks, one of the best networks in China.

Guangzhou Baiyun International Airport is one of the busiest airports in China and in the world.

Air transport 
Two international airports, Guangzhou Baiyun International Airport and Shenzhen Bao'an International Airport, connect the province with major cities in China and in other countries.

Rail transport 

Canton–Sam Shui Railway, built from 1902 to 1904, was the first railway line in Guangdong.

As of 2018 in Guangdong, China Railway Guangzhou Group manages  of railway and regional enterprises manage . Operating high-speed rail networks span .

Cross-border trains 
Inter-city train services crossing the Hong Kong-Guangdong border connect major cities in Guangdong with Hong Kong. Guangzhou–Kowloon through train and Guangzhou–Shenzhen–Hong Kong Express Rail Link (XRL) serve cities between Guangzhou and Hong Kong.

Road transport 
The Guangzhou Provincial Passenger Bus Station is the largest bus station in Guangdong.

In 2020, Guangdong became the first province in China to have over 10,000 km of Expressways.

Water transport 
Ferries connect Guangdong cities within the Pearl River Delta and Hong Kong and Macau.

See also 

 Transport in Hong Kong
 Transport in Macau

References

External links 

 Department of Transportation of Guangdong Province
 China Railway Guangzhou Group